Alexei Sancov (born 15 October 1999) is a Moldovan competitive swimmer. He competed in the men's 200 metre freestyle event at the 2016 Summer Olympics and placed 34th with a time of 1:48.85. He competed at the 2020 Summer Olympics.

Career 
On 2 July 2017, Sancov broke the World Junior record in the 200 meter free at 18 years old and won the gold medal at the European Junior Championships with a time of 1:47.00. That time broke the official World Junior Record at the time in this event, which currently stood at 1:47.10, held by American Maxime Rooney. Rooney swam that time at the 2015 US National Championships in San Antonio, Texas. Earlier in the European Junior Championships he took silver in the 100 meter free with a time of :49.01.

He studied at University of Southern California.

References

External links
 

1999 births
Living people
Moldovan male freestyle swimmers
Sportspeople from Chișinău
Olympic swimmers of Moldova
Swimmers at the 2016 Summer Olympics
Swimmers at the 2014 Summer Youth Olympics
Swimmers at the 2020 Summer Olympics
USC Trojans men's swimmers